Spanish bread can refer to:

Bread in Spain
Pan de horno, a type of bread from Spain also known as "spanish bread"
Señorita bread, a type of elongated bread roll from the Philippines with sweet fillings